The Presbyterian Church in Korea (DaeShin II.) was separated from the Presbyterian Church in Korea (Daeshin) in 1972, Rev. Kim Chi-Sun was the leader. He founded the DaeShin Theological seminary in 1980 it upgraded to a college. The Apostles Creed and the Westminster Confession are the official standards. In 2004 it had 15,200 members in 125 congregations and 155 ordained ministers in 9 Presbyteries and a General assembly.

References 

Presbyterian denominations in South Korea
Presbyterian denominations in Asia